Korean immigration to Hawaii has been constant since the early 20th century. There have been two distinct points at which immigration has peaked: the first wave from 1903 to 1949, the second wave from 1950 to 1964. On January 13, 2003, George W. Bush made a special proclamation honoring the Centennial of Korean Immigration to the United States, recognizing the contributions of Korean Americans to the nation.

Origins
The very first large group of Korean immigrants arrived in the United States on January 13, 1903. The Korean Empire had issued its first English-language passports to these immigrants the previous year. The passengers were a diverse group with various ages and backgrounds. Among the group were fifty-six men recruited as labourers for sugarcane plantations located on various islands in the Territory of Hawaii, as well as twenty-one women and twenty-five children. Within two years of the first arrival of Korean immigrants, the number of Koreans who had migrated to Hawaii had grown to more than 7,000.

The Purpose of Korean immigration to America
The very first large group of Korean Immigrants settled in America between 1901 and 1905. Between those years 7,226 immigrants, including 6,048 men, 637 women, and 541 children, came on 65 trips. Most of the early immigrants of that period had some contracts with American missionaries in Korea. For some Western-oriented Korean intellectuals, immigrating to the United States was considered useful, in part, to help them in the modernization of their homeland. Consequently, the recruiter for laborers for the Hawaiian Sugar Planters' Association (HSPA), David Deshler, had no trouble finding Koreans from a wide range of social classes willing to sail to Hawaii.

According to Dr. Wayne Patterson during his speech to the Royal Asiatic Society (posted on YouTube September 21, 2013) the transfer of Koreans to Hawaii was against the US Emigration Laws regarding foreign Contract Laborers. Deshler recruited Koreans as strikebreakers because Japanese laborers working in the Hawaiian plantations were on strike against the owners of the plantations. Some of the same American business people who overthrew the Hawaiian Monarchy were in collusion with Dr. Horace Allen and Deshler to conjure up a plan to get away with breaking the US Emigration Laws to deal with Japanese worker's strike problems. Most of the Koreans came to Hawaii from 1903 to 1905 through a money-laundering scam that paid for the boat passengers' fares from Korea to Hawaii, violating the law. In some cases, the Koreans were forced to pay back their fare money to the HSPA.

Decades of new hope, hardships and barriers
Within a century the Korean population in America exploded from roughly seven thousand to about two million.

King Gojong (1852–1919) reigned in Korea at the time of the first migration to America and played a crucial part in the lives of Koreans abroad. Christian missionaries had found their way to Korea during King Gojong's reign. By the 1890s, American missionaries were the most influential in spreading Christianity in Korea. Dr. Horace Allen, missionary-turned-diplomat, was embroiled in Korean politics and in effect was the representative for American trade. The missionaries brought not only Christianity, but also capitalism, Western learning, and Western culture. Many of the immigrants had converted to Christianity.

Protestant evangelism in Korea was predominantly Methodist and Presbyterian. The two Protestant groups decided not to overlap their evangelizing activities. They agreed that the Methodist mission in Hawai'i would minister to the Korean immigrants.

Korea's first formal treaty with America was in May 1882. The treaty was preceded by America's forgotten "little war" of bloody exchanges between the two countries. The little-known episode in American history involved a heavily armed American ship, the Colorado, entering Korean waters and landing its soldiers on Ganghwa Island. A battle ensued in which more than three hundred Koreans and three American soldiers were killed.

The Americans later returned pursuing a treaty, resulting in the Treaty of Amity and Commerce in 1882. Among other things, the treaty contained a provision allowing Korean immigration to America. The first group of immigrants came from Rev. George Heber Jones' Methodist parish in Jemulpo (Inchon).

Immigrants prior to 1903: Historical statistics of Hawai'i indicate there were sixteen Koreans in the Territory of Hawai'i in 1902. Some are said to have been ginseng merchants in disguise who came using Chinese passports. One of these ginseng merchants was Choo Eun Yang, who came to Hawai'i and transmigrated to San Francisco around 1898. He became active in the Korean community there, became prosperous, and lived to the age of 102. Among other immigrants, Sung Pong Chang worked for the Circuit Court of Hawai'i and for the Honolulu Police Department as an interpreter until he died in 1949.
Four famous Korean immigrants: Dr. Philip Jaisohn (1866–1951), Dr. Syngman Rhee (1875–1965), Dosan Ahn Chang Ho (1878–1938), and Young Man Pak (1877–1928). See also List of notable Korean Americans in Hawaii.

Koreatown

Korean businesses congregate on Keeaumoku Street, which earned the nickname "Koreamoku." Although it has not been officially designated as a Koreatown, the Koreatown designation has been considered by the State of Hawaii within the past few years.

Notable Korean Americans in Hawaii

Dr. Philip Jaisohn (1866–1951)
Dr. Syngman Rhee (1875–1965)
Young Man Pak (1877–1928)
Herbert Young Cho Choy (born 1916-01-06, Makaweli, Hawaii–2004-03-10) was the first Asian American federal judge in the history of the United States, as well as the first person of Korean ancestry to be admitted to practice law in the United States.
Daniel Dae Kim (born 1968-08-04) is a Korean American actor, best known for playing Jin-Soo Kwon on the television series Lost and played the role of Chin Ho Kelly on Hawaii Five-0.
Harry Kim was the mayor of Hawaii County, Hawaii, United States
Ronald Moon (Korean name: 문대양 born 1940-09-04) was the Chief Justice of the Hawaii State Supreme Court in Honolulu, Hawaii
Michelle Sung Wie (Korean Wie Seong-mi; hangul: 위성미 hanja: 魏聖美; born 1989-10-11) is a Korean-American professional golfer. In 2006, she was named in a Time magazine article, "one of 100 people who shape our world."
Jay Dee "B.J." Penn (born December 13, 1978 in Kailua, Hawaii) is a Korean-American professional mixed martial arts (MMA) fighter and Jiu-Jitsu practitioner, former Ultimate Fighting Championship lightweight champion.

See also

 Filipinos in Hawaii
 Japanese in Hawaii
Chinese immigration to Hawaii
Puerto Rican immigration to Hawaii

Notes

References

 
Hawaii
History of immigration to Hawaii